Kalle Aukusti Matilainen (28 September 1899 – 28 June 1985) was a Finnish runner. He competed at the 1928 Olympics in the 10,000 m event and finished in eighth place. His younger brothers Jukka and Martti were also Olympic runners.

References

1899 births
1985 deaths
People from Mikkeli
People from Mikkeli Province (Grand Duchy of Finland)
Athletes (track and field) at the 1928 Summer Olympics
Olympic athletes of Finland
Finnish male long-distance runners
Sportspeople from South Savo